The 1948 Maryland Terrapins football team represented the University of Maryland in 1948 college football season as a member of the Southern Conference (SoCon).  Jim Tatum served as the head coach for the second year of his nine-year tenure. The Terrapins compiled a 6–4 record, which proved to be the worst of Tatum's term at Maryland and the only one in which his team lost more than two games. Griffith Stadium was temporarily used as the home field, as an interim venue between the original Byrd Stadium and the much larger, newly constructed stadium of the same name.

Schedule

Coaching staff
Jim Tatum, head coach
Flucie Stewart
George Barclay
Houston Elder
Sully Krouse
John Cudmore
Warren Giese
Bill Meek, freshman coach
Duke Wyre, trainer
W. W. Cobey, graduate manager

References

Maryland
Maryland Terrapins football seasons
Maryland Terrapins football